Chalcidica is a genus of moths in the family Cossidae.

Species
 Chalcidica maculescens Yakovlev, 2011
 Chalcidica mineus (Cramer, 1779)
 Chalcidica pallescens (Roepke, 1955)

References

Natural History Museum Lepidoptera generic names catalog

Zeuzerinae